The UEFA Futsal Euro 2014 qualifying competition consisted of a preliminary round, a main round, a play-off round and a twelve-team final tournament played in Belgium. In the preliminary round, four groups of four teams each and two of three were played as one-venue mini-tournaments from 22 to 27 January 2013. The six group winners were joined by the 22 highest-ranked qualifying contenders in seven groups of four teams, played as one-venue mini-tournaments between 27 and 30 March 2013. The seven group winners progressed to the final tournament, where they joined hosts Belgium, while the seven runners-up and best third-placed team entered the play-offs. In the play-offs, the eight teams were drawn into four pairs to play two-legged ties on 17 and 24 September. The four winners completed the final tournament lineup.

Preliminary round
The preliminary round consisted of 22 teams, split in six groups of 3 or 4 teams. The round was played in round-robin format. Winners of each groups qualify for the qualifying round, where they are joined by the 22 best-ranked teams. Denmark, Gibraltar, Sweden and Wales debuted in an international qualification.

Group A
Venue: Hall of Sports Charles Ehrman, Nice, France

Group B
Venue: Hibernians Pavillon, Paola, Malta

Group C
Venue: S.Darius & S.Girenas Sport Center, Kaunas, Lithuania

Group D
Venue: Skaptopara, Blagoevgrad, Bulgaria

Group E
Venue: Centre Esportiu Serradells, Andorra la Vella, Andorra

Group F
Venue: Le Centre Sportif des Iles, Yverdon, Switzerland

Qualified to main round
 Group A →  → Group 1
 Group B →  → Group 6
 Group C →  → Group 7
 Group D →  → Group 5
 Group E →  → Group 4
 Group F →  → Group 2

Main round
The six preliminary round winners join the 22 highest-ranked qualifying contenders in seven groups of four teams played as one-venue mini-tournaments between 27 and 30 March 2013. The seven group winners progress to the final tournament, while the seven runners-up and best third-placed team enter the play-offs.

Group 1
Venues: Skips dre cnt, Bari efo Idris a Gums, Caernarfon, Wales

Group 2
Venue: Interhala Pasienky, Bratislava, Slovakia

Group 3
Venue: Zemgales Olympic Centre, Jelgava, Latvia

Group 4
Venue: Diego Calvo Valera Hall, Águilas, Spain

Group 5
Venue: Medison Hall, Zrenjanin, Serbia

Group 6
Venue: Topsportcentrum, Rotterdam, Netherlands

Group 7
Venue: Erzurum Buz Arena Sports Hall, Erzurum, Turkey

Ranking of third-placed teams
The best third-place team qualified for the play-off.

Play-off round
The eight teams were drawn into four pairs to play two-legged ties on 17–18 and 24 September 2013. The four winners complete the final tournament lineup. The draw for the playoffs took place in Nyon on 3 July 2013.

|}

Qualified teams
 
  (hosts)

References

Q
Uefa
2014